The Colombian Air Service, or SACO, was an early Colombian airline. Founded in 1933, in 1940 SACO merged with the Colombo-German Air Transport Company (Sociedad Colombo-Alemana de Transportes Aéreos, or SCADTA); the new company was named Avianca (Aerovías Nacionales de Colombia).  Avianca still operates to this day, and claims SCADTA's history as its own, thus making it the second-oldest airline in the world.

History
On June 23, 1934, Ernesto Samper arrived in Bogotá with three Curtiss Kingbird and four American aviators hired to operate them. With these aircraft, the SACO expanded its operations to other cities, Bucaramanga, Cartago, Montería and Cartagena.

Accidents and incidents
On June 24, 1935, a Ford Trimotor of SACO collided during take off with another Ford Trimotor of SCADTA at Medellín, Colombia. 15 people were killed, including the world-famous tango singer Carlos Gardel. After the accident, the SACO airline stopped operating for some time, while it was reorganized and new aircraft were acquired.

See also
1935 in aviation
Avianca
List of defunct airlines of Colombia

References

Avianca
Defunct airlines of Colombia
Airlines established in 1933
Airlines disestablished in 1940
1940 mergers and acquisitions
1933 establishments in Colombia
1940 disestablishments in Colombia